NGC 7752 and NGC 7753 are a pair of galaxies approximately 272 million light-years away in the constellation Pegasus.

NGC 7753 is the primary galaxy. It is a barred spiral galaxy with a small nucleus. NGC 7752 is the satellite galaxy of NGC 7753. It is a barred lenticular galaxy that is apparently attached to one of NGC 7753's spiral arms. They resemble the Whirlpool Galaxy (M51A) and its satellite NGC 5195 (M51B).

Supernovae

The first supernova detected in NGC 7753 was SN 2006A in January 2006. It was followed four months later by SN 2006ch, a Type Ia supernova. In January 2013 another Type Ia supernova, SN 2013Q, was detected, and in August 2015 a Type II supernova, SN 2015ae, was discovered.

See also 
 Dwingeloo 1
 Dwingeloo 2

References

External links 
 Galaxies NGC 7753 & NGC 7752 in Pegasus
 

Lenticular galaxies
Intermediate spiral galaxies
Interacting galaxies
Pegasus (constellation)
7752
12779
72382
086